Oscar Alberto Ghiglia (born 13 August 1938) is an Italian classical guitarist.

Biography

Early years
Born in Livorno to an artistic family – his father and grandfather were both famed painters, his mother an accomplished pianist – Oscar Ghiglia had to choose between a path strewn with brushes and colours and a world cut into harmony and melody.

Though his early choice produced a few hundred water colours and a number of oil paintings, he soon realized music was his way. For this decision he thanks his father, who one day made him pose for a painting showing a guitarist. For this he had to hold his father's guitar, a companion to his artistic musings in front of his forming works. This painting was the start to a lifetime of disciplined dedication to music.

Musical career
Oscar Ghiglia graduated from the Santa Cecilia Conservatory in Rome and soon began study with Andrés Segovia, who was his major influence and inspiration during his formative years. Later Oscar Ghiglia "inherited" Segovia's class in Siena's Accademia Chigiana and spread his own teaching around the five continents in a sister vocation to his concertizing.

Oscar Ghiglia founded the Guitar Department at the Aspen Music Festival, (Aspen, Colorado, USA) as well as the Festival de Musique des Arcs and the "Incontri Chitarristici di Gargnano", of having been artist in residence, or visiting professor in such centers as the Cincinnati and San Francisco conservatories, the Juilliard School, the Hartt School and the Northwestern University of Evanston, Illinois. In all these centers and elsewhere Ghiglia has been nurturing talents and forming or perfecting young artists' musical outlook and interpretation.

He has been teaching at the Accademia Musicale Chigiana since 1976.

Besides touring as a solo performer, Oscar Ghiglia has played and recorded with such names as singers Victoria de Los Angeles, Jan de Gaetani, Gerald English, John McCollum; flutists as Jean-Pierre Rampal and Julius Baker; ensembles as the Juilliard String Quartet, the Emerson String Quartet, the Cleveland String Quartet, the Quartetto d’archi di Venezia and the Tokyo String Quartet; violinists as Giuliano Carmignola, Franco Gulli, Salvatore Accardo and Régis Pasquier; violists such as B. Giuranna, and P. Zuckerman; cellists as Adam Krzeszowiec, Albert Roman and Laszlo Varga; guitarists such as Eliot Fisk, Shin-Ichi Fukuda, Letizia Guerra, Antigoni Goni, and Elena Papandreou. Oscar Ghiglia was a founding member of the International Classic Guitar Quartet (with, in different turns: Benjamin Bunch, O. Koga, Anders Miolin, S. Schmidt, and Andreas von Wangenheim).

Presently, after his newest CD Manuel Ponce Guitar music, a new set of recording projects is under way (note a J.S . Bach lute works CD, in the final editing process) and his teaching continues, year long, in Basel Switzerland, where he has held the professorship in guitar at the Musik-Akademie der Stadt Basel from 1983 to 2004.

Founder of the International Guitar Competition of Gargnano (Italy), Ghiglia boasts a very high number of first prize winners among his students, in competitions around the world.

Retirement from the Basel Musik-Akademie
In 2006, after retiring from the Basel Musik-Akademie in Switzerland, where he had held the professorship in guitar from 1983 to 2004, he moved to Greece, following his marriage to colleague and former pupil Elena Papandreou, now guitar professor in the University of Makedonia in Thessaloniki.

Following his CDs Manuel Ponce Guitar music, J.S. Bach Lute Works, and a DVD of his favourite repertoire, he continues his concertizing across the oceans, his residencies in the universities of Cincinnati, Ohio, Evanston, Illinois, as well as his summer teaching in the Accademia Chigiana of Siena and his "Incontri Chitarristici di Gargnano", on the shores of Lake Garda.

External links 
 Oscar Ghiglia- Accademia Musicale Chigiana
 Interview with Oscar Ghiglia, April 15, 1998

Recordings
Some photos of LP covers (Oviatt Library Digital Collections)

1938 births
Aspen Music Festival and School faculty
Italian classical guitarists
Italian male guitarists
Juilliard School faculty
Living people
Northwestern University faculty
San Francisco Conservatory of Music faculty
University of Hartford Hartt School faculty
University of Cincinnati faculty